The following outline is provided as an overview of and topical guide to Malaysia:

Malaysia is a sovereign country located on the Malay Peninsula and a northern portion of the Island of Borneo in Southeast Asia. The capital of Malaysia is Kuala Lumpur, while Putrajaya is the seat of the federal government.

The population stands at over 32 million. The country is separated into two regions—Peninsular Malaysia and Malaysian Borneo—by the South China Sea. Malaysia borders Thailand, Indonesia, Singapore, Brunei, the Philippines, and Vietnam. The country is located near the equator and experiences a tropical climate.

Malaysia is headed by the Yang di-Pertuan Agong and politically led by a Prime Minister. The government is closely modeled after the Westminster parliamentary system.

General reference 

 Pronunciation:  or 
 Common English country name:  Malaysia
 Official English country name:  Malaysia
 Common endonym(s): Malaysia
 Official endonym(s): Malaysia
 Adjectival(s): Malaysian
 Demonym(s): Malaysians
 Etymology: Name of Malaysia
 International rankings of Malaysia
 ISO country codes:  MY, MYS, 458
 ISO region codes:  See ISO 3166-2:MY
 Internet country code top-level domain: .my

History of Malaysia 

 Military history of Malaysia

Events and treaties 
 Anglo-Dutch Treaty of 1824
 Burney Treaty
 Anglo-Siamese Treaty of 1909
 Battle of Malaya
 Sandakan Death Marches
 Brunei Revolt
 Indonesia–Malaysia confrontation
 May 13 incident
 Mat Salleh Rebellion

Small area histories 
 History of Kuala Lumpur
 History of Penang

Politics of Malaysia 

Politics of Malaysia
 Form of government: Federal constitutional elective monarchy and parliamentary democracy
 Capital of Malaysia: Kuala Lumpur
 Flag of Malaysia
 Elections in Malaysia
 1955, 1959, 1964, 1969, 1974, 1978, 1982, 1986, 1990, 1995, 1999, 2004, 2008, 2013, 2018
 Political parties in Malaysia
 National Front (Barisan Nasional)
 United Malays National Organisation (UMNO)
 Malaysian Chinese Association (MCA)
 Malaysian Indian Congress (MIC)
 Malaysian People's Movement Party (Gerakan)
 People's Progressive Party (PPP)
 United Traditional Bumiputera Party (PBB)
 Sarawak United People's Party (SUPP)
 Sabah Progressive Party (SAPP)
 Sabah United Party (PBS)
 Liberal Democratic Party (LDP)
 United Sabah People's Party (PBRS)
 United Pasokmomogun Kadazandusun Murut Organisation (UPKO)
 Sarawak Progressive Democratic Party (SPDP)
 Sarawak People's Party (PRS)
 Alliance of Hope (Pakatan Harapan)
 People's Justice Party (Keadilan; PKR)
 Democratic Action Party (DAP)
 National Trust Party (AMANAH)
 National Alliance (Perikatan National)
 Parti Pribumi Bersatu Malaysia (BERSATU; PBBM)
 Pan-Malaysian Islamic Party (PAS)
 Parti Gerakan Rakyat Malaysia (GERAKAN; PGRM)
 Malaysian People's Party (PRM)
 Socialist Party of Malaysia (PSM)
 Malaysian Democratic Party (MDP)
 Malaysian United Democratic Alliance (MUDA)
 Yang di-Pertuan Agong (King of Malaysia)
 Conference of Rulers
 Civil Service in Malaysia

Branches of the government of Malaysia 

Government of Malaysia

Executive branch of the government of Malaysia 

 Head of state: Yang di-Pertuan Agong, Muhammad V
 Head of government: Prime Minister of Malaysia, Mahathir Mohamad
 Cabinet of Malaysia
 Ministries of Malaysia
 Ministry of Home Affairs
 Ministry of Education
 Ministry of Foreign Affairs
 Ministry of Higher Education
 Ministry of Internal Security (Malaysia)
 Ministry of Science, Technology and Innovation
 Ministry of Women, Family and Community Development
 Ministry of the Federal Territories

Legislative branch of the government of Malaysia 

 Parliament of Malaysia (bicameral)
 Upper house: Dewan Negara
 Lower house: Dewan Rakyat

Judicial branch of the government of Malaysia 

Courts of Malaysia
 Federal Court of Malaysia
 Court of Appeal of Malaysia
 High Courts of Malaysia
 Syariah Court

Foreign relations of Malaysia 

Foreign relations of Malaysia
 Diplomatic missions in Malaysia
 Diplomatic missions of Malaysia

International organisation membership 
Malaysia is a member of:

Asian Development Bank (ADB)
Asia-Pacific Economic Cooperation (APEC)
Asia-Pacific Telecommunity (APT)
Association of Southeast Asian Nations (ASEAN)
Association of Southeast Asian Nations Regional Forum (ARF)
Bank for International Settlements (BIS)
Colombo Plan (CP)
Commonwealth of Nations
East Asia Summit (EAS)
Food and Agriculture Organization (FAO)
Group of 15 (G15)
Group of 77 (G77)
International Atomic Energy Agency (IAEA)
International Bank for Reconstruction and Development (IBRD)
International Chamber of Commerce (ICC)
International Civil Aviation Organization (ICAO)
International Criminal Police Organization (Interpol)
International Development Association (IDA)
International Federation of Red Cross and Red Crescent Societies (IFRCS)
International Finance Corporation (IFC)
International Fund for Agricultural Development (IFAD)
International Hydrographic Organization (IHO)
International Labour Organization (ILO)
International Maritime Organization (IMO)
International Mobile Satellite Organization (IMSO)
International Monetary Fund (IMF)
International Olympic Committee (IOC)
International Organization for Standardization (ISO)
International Red Cross and Red Crescent Movement (ICRM)
International Telecommunication Union (ITU)

International Telecommunications Satellite Organization (ITSO)
International Trade Union Confederation (ITUC)
Inter-Parliamentary Union (IPU)
Islamic Development Bank (IDB)
Multilateral Investment Guarantee Agency (MIGA)
Nonaligned Movement (NAM)
Organisation of Islamic Cooperation (OIC)
Organisation for the Prohibition of Chemical Weapons (OPCW)
Pacific Islands Forum (PIF) (partner)
Permanent Court of Arbitration (PCA)
United Nations (UN)
United Nations Conference on Trade and Development (UNCTAD)
United Nations Educational, Scientific, and Cultural Organization (UNESCO)
United Nations Industrial Development Organization (UNIDO)
United Nations Integrated Mission in Timor-Leste (UNMIT)
United Nations Interim Force in Lebanon (UNIFIL)
United Nations Mission for the Referendum in Western Sahara (MINURSO)
United Nations Mission in Liberia (UNMIL)
United Nations Mission in the Sudan (UNMIS)
United Nations Organization Mission in the Democratic Republic of the Congo (MONUC)
Universal Postal Union (UPU)
World Confederation of Labour (WCL)
World Customs Organization (WCO)
World Federation of Trade Unions (WFTU)
World Health Organization (WHO)
World Intellectual Property Organization (WIPO)
World Meteorological Organization (WMO)
World Tourism Organization (UNWTO)
World Trade Organization (WTO)

Law and order in Malaysia 

Law of Malaysia
 Capital punishment in Malaysia
 Constitution of Malaysia
 Crime in Malaysia
 Human rights in Malaysia
 LGBT rights in Malaysia
 Freedom of religion in Malaysia
 Law enforcement in Malaysia

Military of Malaysia 

Military of Malaysia
 Command
 Commander-in-chief: Supreme Commander of the Malaysian Armed Forces, Muhammad V of Kelantan
 Chief of Defence Forces: General (Jen) Tan Sri Zulkifli Zainal Abidin
 Ministry of Defence of Malaysia
 Forces
 Army of Malaysia
 Navy of Malaysia
 Air Force of Malaysia
 Malaysian Special Operations Force
 Military history of Malaysia

Geography of Malaysia 

Geography of Malaysia
 Malaysia is: a megadiverse country
 Location:
 Northern Hemisphere and Eastern Hemisphere
 Eurasia (both on the mainland and offshore)
 Asia
 Southeast Asia
 Malay Peninsula
 Borneo
 Time zone:  Malaysian Standard Time = ASEAN Common Time (UTC+08)
 Extreme points of Malaysia
 High:  Gunung Kinabalu 
 Low:  South China Sea and Indian Ocean 0 m
 Land boundaries:  2,669 km
 1,782 km
 506 km
 381 km
 Coastline:  4,675 km
 Peninsular Malaysia 2,068 km
 East Malaysia 2,607 km
 Population of Malaysia: 27,730,000 - 43rd most populous country
 Area of Malaysia: 329,847 km² - 66th largest country
 Atlas of Malaysia
 Malaysian Standard Time

Environment of Malaysia 

Environment of Malaysia
 Climate of Malaysia
 Environmental issues in Malaysia
 List of ecoregions in Malaysia
 Renewable energy in Malaysia
 Protected areas of Malaysia
 National parks of Malaysia
 Wildlife of Malaysia
 Birds of Malaysia
 Mammals of Malaysia

Natural geographic features of Malaysia 
 Islands of Malaysia
 Lakes of Malaysia
 Mountains of Malaysia
 Volcanoes in Malaysia
 Caves in Malaysia
 Rivers of Malaysia
 List of World Heritage Sites in Malaysia

Regions of Malaysia 
 West Malaysia (Peninsula Malaysia)
 East Malaysia (Malaysian Borneo)

Ecoregions of Malaysia 

List of ecoregions in Malaysia
 Ecoregions in Malaysia

Administrative divisions of Malaysia 

Administrative divisions of Malaysia
 Local government in Malaysia
 Mukim

States of Malaysia 

States of Malaysia
Malaysia has 13 states:

Federal territories of Malaysia 

Malaysia also has three federal territories, which are governed directly by the federal government of Malaysia:

Districts of Malaysia 

Districts of Malaysia

Municipalities of Malaysia 

Municipalities of Malaysia
 Cities of Malaysia
 Capital of Malaysia: Kuala Lumpur
 State capitals of Malaysia
 Cities, by population

Economy and infrastructure of Malaysia 

Economy of Malaysia
 Economic rank, by nominal GDP (2007): 38th (thirty-eighth)
 Agriculture in Malaysia
 Accounting in Malaysia
 Banking in Malaysia
 Banks in Malaysia
 National Bank of Malaysia
 Islamic banking
Currency of Malaysia: Ringgit
ISO 4217: MYR
 Communications in Malaysia
 Internet in Malaysia
 Companies of Malaysia
 Energy in Malaysia
 Health care in Malaysia
 Mining in Malaysia
 Science and technology in Malaysia
 Poverty in Malaysia
 Malaysia Stock Exchange
 Telecommunications in Malaysia
 Tourism in Malaysia
 Transport in Malaysia
 Airports in Malaysia
 Rail transport in Malaysia
 Roads in Malaysia
 Water supply and sanitation in Malaysia

Economic plans and policies 
 First Malaysia Plan
 Second Malaysia Plan
 Malaysian New Economic Policy
 National Development Policy
 Energy policy of Malaysia

Demography of Malaysia 

Demographics of Malaysia
 Languages of Malaysia
 Malaysian citizenship
 Healthcare in Malaysia

Religion 

Religion in Malaysia
 Buddhism in Malaysia
 Christianity in Malaysia
 Hinduism in Malaysia
 Islam in Malaysia
 Judaism in Malaysia
 Sikhism in Malaysia

Ethnicities 
 Bumiputra
 Malaysian Malays
 Malaysian Chinese
 Malaysian Indian

Culture of Malaysia 

Culture of Malaysia

 Cuisine of Malaysia
 Media of Malaysia
 Museums in Malaysia
 Prostitution in Malaysia

 National symbols of Malaysia
 Coat of arms of Malaysia
 Flag of Malaysia
 National anthem of Malaysia
 Royal Regalia of Malaysia

 People of Malaysia
 Public holidays in Malaysia
 List of World Heritage Sites in Malaysia

Art in Malaysia 
 Art in Malaysia
 List of Malaysian artists
 Cinema of Malaysia
 Literature of Malaysia
 Music of Malaysia
 Television in Malaysia

Sports in Malaysia 

Sports in Malaysia
 Football in Malaysia
 Malaysia at the Olympics

Education in Malaysia 

Education in Malaysia
 Ministry of Education
 Ministry of Higher Education
 Malaysian Qualifications Framework
 List of schools in Malaysia
 List of post-secondary institutions in Malaysia
 List of universities in Malaysia
 Issues in Malaysian Education

Standardised examinations
 Ujian Pencapaian Sekolah Rendah (UPSR)
 Pentaksiran Tingkatan Tiga (PT3)
 Sijil Pelajaran Malaysia (SPM)
 Sijil Tinggi Persekolahan Malaysia (STPM)

See also 

Malaysia

Index of Malaysia-related articles
List of international rankings
List of Malaysia-related topics
 Malay units of measurement
Member state of the Commonwealth of Nations
Member state of the United Nations
Outline of Asia
Outline of geography

Notes 

  UMNO was deregistered in 1988 and the Prime Minister of Malaysia formed a new party known as United Malays National Organisation (Baru) on February 16, 1988. The term "Baru" or "New" was removed by a constitutional amendment on July of the same year.
  The United Sabah Party (Parti Bersatu Sabah) was a member of Barisan Nasional from its establishment in 1985 until its withdrawal from the coalition in 1990. The party rejoined the coalition in 2002.
  The Pan-Malaysian Islamic Party entered a coalition with the former Alliance Party in 1972 and subsequently joined the Barisan Nasional coalition when it was founded in 1974. It withdrew from the coalition in 1977.

References

External links 

 Government
 myGovernment Portal – Malaysian Government Portal
 Office of the Prime Minister of Malaysia
 Department of Statistics Malaysia

 Maps
 

 Overviews and Data
 Malaysia at Encyclopædia Britannica
 Malaysia at The World Factbook

National symbols of Malaysia
Communications in Malaysia
Malaysia